The 1930 United States House of Representatives elections were elections for the United States House of Representatives to elect members to serve in the 72nd United States Congress. They were held for the most part on November 4, 1930, while Maine held theirs on September 8. They occurred in the middle of President Herbert Hoover's term.

During the election cycle, the nation was entering its second year of the Great Depression, and Hoover was perceived as doing little to solve the crisis, with his personal popularity being very low. His Republican Party was initially applauded for instituting protectionist economic policies, which were intended to limit imports to stimulate the domestic market: however, after the passage of the heavily damaging Smoot-Hawley Tariff, a policy that was bitterly opposed by the Democratic Party, public opinion turned sharply against Republican policies, and the party  bore the blame for the economic collapse.

While the Democrats gained 52 seats in the 1930 midterm elections, Republicans retained a narrow one-seat majority of 218 seats after the polls closed versus the Democrats' 216 seats; however, during the 13 months between these elections and the start of the 72nd Congress, 14 members-elect died (including incumbent Speaker Nicholas Longworth), and the Democrats gained an additional three seats in the special elections called to fill these vacancies, thus gaining control of the House (they held a 219–212 advantage over the Republicans when the new Congress convened).

This was the first of four consecutive Depression-era House elections in which Democrats made enormous gains, achieving a cumulative gain of 174 seats. Over the ensuing 64 years (until the 1994 midterm elections), House Republicans would be in the minority for all but four years, winning majorities only in 1946 and in 1952.

Overall results

Source: Election Statistics - Office of the Clerk

Special elections 

Elections are listed by date and district.

Alabama

Arizona

Arkansas

California

Colorado

Connecticut

Delaware

Florida

Georgia

Idaho

Illinois

Indiana

Iowa

Kansas

Kentucky

Louisiana

Maine

Maryland

Massachusetts

Michigan

Minnesota

Mississippi

Missouri

Montana

Nebraska

Nevada

New Hampshire

New Jersey

New Mexico

New York

North Carolina

North Dakota

Ohio

Oklahoma

Oregon

Pennsylvania

Rhode Island

South Carolina

South Dakota

Tennessee

Texas

Utah

Vermont

Virginia

Washington

West Virginia

Wisconsin

Wyoming

Non-voting delegates

Alaska Territory

See also
 1930 United States elections
 1930 United States Senate elections
 71st United States Congress
 72nd United States Congress

Notes

References

Further research 
 Stevens, Susan. "The Congressional Elections of 1930: Politics of Avoidance" in Milton Plesur, ed., American Historian: Essays to Honor Selig Adler (1980), pp 149–158.
 Susan F. Stevens, "Congressional Elections of 1930: Politics of Avoidance" (Ph.D. dissertation, State University of New York at Buffalo, 1980), reports that the depression seems to have not played as much of a role as prohibition, farm policy and the Smoot Hawley Tariff issues.  This study focuses on the political environment of the immediate post-Crash period. Contrary to modern anticipation and historical precedent, the first elections after the Stock Market debacle proved remarkably inconclusive. Despite a host of impediments, of which economic uncertainty was only one, the incumbent Republican party managed to retain control of Congress. The margin, however, was not durable enough to withstand the deepening financial crisis. By the time the 72nd Congress was convened thirteen months later, the Democrats had secured the House of Representatives through a series of by-elections. Contemporary analysis of the 1930-31 period reveals a curious sense of ambivalence which those election results sustain. Newspapers, journals, popular publications and manuscripts have provided the main source of evidence. These subjective accounts have been weighed against the voting tallies in order to determine the context of the most significant campaigns and their results.  Surprisingly, the issue of economic depression was a minor concern during the general elections. Prohibition, tariff and farm policy featured far more prominently during the fall of 1930. By 1931, however, the economic issue had become predominant and voters registered their dismay by electing Democrats. This study indicates that the mutual reluctance of either political party to deal with the depression issue, coupled with an initial disinclination by voters to upset a heretofore comfortable status quo, produced an electoral ambivalence unequalled in American congressional politics. Only the continued inability of the Republican administration to reverse economic disruption persuaded voters to embrace the unproven abilities of Democratic legislators.